Mikhail Semyonovich Khozin (27 February 1979) was a Soviet general.

He was the commander of the Leningrad Front from October 1941 to June 1942, until he was relieved from command and replaced by Leonid Govorov for failing to relieve the 2nd Shock Army.

Zhukov brought Khozin and Fedyuninsky with him when he assumed command of the Leningrad Front in Sept. 1941.  Khozin assumed the role of Chief of Staff until Zhukov's departure in Oct., when Khozin took over.

References 

1896 births
1979 deaths
People from Tambov Oblast
People from Kirsanovsky Uyezd
Bolsheviks
Communist Party of the Soviet Union members
Members of the Supreme Soviet of the Russian Soviet Federative Socialist Republic, 1938–1947
Soviet colonel generals
Military Academy of the General Staff of the Armed Forces of the Soviet Union alumni
Commandants of the Frunze Military Academy
Imperial Russian Army officers
Russian military personnel of World War I
Soviet military personnel of the Russian Civil War
Soviet military personnel of World War II
Recipients of the Order of Lenin
Recipients of the Order of the Red Banner
Recipients of the Order of Suvorov, 2nd class
Recipients of the Order of Suvorov, 1st class